Final Fantasy VII, a role-playing video game developed by Square (now Square Enix) and originally released in 1997, features many fictional characters in both major and minor roles. VII has been followed by multiple sequels and prequels, grouped into the multimedia series Compilation of Final Fantasy VII: these include the 2004 mobile game Before Crisis, the 2005 movie sequel Advent Children, the 2006 shooter spinoff Dirge of Cerberus, and the 2007 action game Crisis Core. Other media include spin-off books and the original video animation Last Order. The setting of Final Fantasy VII is a world that has been described as an industrial or post-industrial science fiction setting. It is referred to as "the Planet" in most of the games, and was retroactively named "Gaia" in some Square Enix promotional material.

VII follows Cloud Strife, a troubled mercenary who joins with an eco-terrorist group to stop Shinra from draining the life of the Planet to use as an energy source. As the story progresses, conflicts escalate and the world's safety becomes their central concern as new forces emerge to challenge the original group. Cloud and his team eventually face off against the game's antagonist, Sephiroth. Other important characters in the series include Aerith Gainsborough, a flower seller who becomes a good friend to Cloud; Zack Fair, Cloud's friend, a former soldier of Shinra and the protagonist of Crisis Core; and Vincent Valentine, a man made immortal by Shinra experimentation and the protagonist of Dirge of Cerberus. The conflict between Cloud and Sephiroth forms the core narrative around which many of the series' stories are built. Other characters include the Turks, a covert group which originally worked for Shinra.

The original characters were designed by Tetsuya Nomura, who had done monster designs for Final Fantasy VI and was chosen for the role after his designs impressed producer Hironobu Sakaguchi. Nomura was responsible for many of the characters and their stories. The scenario for the original game was written by Sakaguchi, Yoshinori Kitase and Kazushige Nojima. Nomura, Kitase and Nojima have been involved in other titles in the Compilation. The characters of VII have met with positive reception in contemporary and modern reviews, while their portrayal in the Compilation titles has been mixed: while Crisis Core was generally praised, the focus on secondary characters in Dirge of Cerberus drew mixed opinions from some, while their appearance in Advent Children was generally cited as confusing or poor for newcomers to the series. The entire cast, along with multiple side characters and villains, have remained popular among critics and series fans over the years, with many lists and opinion polls citing them as some of the best characters in the Final Fantasy series.

Concept and creation
The original concept for Final Fantasy VIIs world was for a fully modern setting, but after the project moved from the 2D Super Nintendo Entertainment System to development for the PlayStation console, the setting altered with it. Elements from the original concept were later used in Final Fantasy VIII and Parasite Eve. The game's producer, Hironobu Sakaguchi, chose character designer Tetsuya Nomura to create the main cast. Nomura had previously worked on monster designs for Final Fantasy VI. Sakaguchi chose Nomura after being amused by the way Nomura did the storyboarding for the cutscenes. Talking of his role as character designer, Nomura stated that when he was brought on, the main scenario had not been completed, but he "went along like, 'I guess first off you need a hero and a heroine', and from there drew the designs while thinking up details about the characters. After [he'd] done the hero and heroine, [he] carried on drawing by thinking what kind of characters would be interesting to have. When [he] handed over the designs [he'd] tell people the character details [he'd] thought up, or write them down on a separate sheet of paper". Nomura also created Zack Fair, who was a late addition to the cast meant to add depth to Cloud and Aerith's relationship, and came up with the name for Red XIII, wanting an "interesting" name that combined a color and a number. Although the game was Nomura's favorite Final Fantasy project, he felt that it was hindered by graphical limitations, and that his designs were, consequently, very plain in comparison to his "true" style.

The game's plot was created by Sakaguchi, although the majority of scenario writing was done by Yoshinori Kitase and Kazushige Nojima, who conceived of the Shinra plot thread, Cloud and Sephiroth's relationship and Cloud's backstory. The Lifestream, the source of life for the planet, was one of the earliest concepts created for VII, but its depiction and purpose changed drastically during development. The concepts behind the Lifestream and Aerith's iconic death scene were sparked in Sakaguchi by the death of his mother, which inspired a wish to create a realistic death for Aerith rather than a "Hollywood" sacrificial death. 

The "dark" theme described by Nomura is continued throughout the Compilation, with characters such as Kadaj, Loz and Yazoo in Final Fantasy VII: Advent Children and the Tsviets in Dirge of Cerberus: Final Fantasy VII. Kitase stated that voice acting was one of the topics to which the Compilation team paid close attention. As Cloud and Vincent have similar personalities, care was taken to differentiate between them and their dialogue. The compilation was originally conceived as only one title (Advent Children), which focused on Tifa and Cloud, but they eventually expanded it into a collection which included other games focusing on other characters, such as Zack and Vincent. Nomura himself requested Hajime Tabata, the director of Before Crisis, to create a game focusing on the Turks.

With Advent Children following works, the cast was redesigned. While designing the characters, the staff discovered that it was impossible to translate the Final Fantasy VII designs into the film. Thus some identifying characteristics had to be discarded. Cloud's redesign was a combination of eight different designs, from his super deformed appearance in the game to his more realistic appearance in the film. The difficulties in making Sephiroth led the staff to reduce his appearances in the film. It took them two years to develop and refine his look. Nozue also had difficulty developing a framework for Tifa's body that was "balanced, yet showed off her feminine qualities". For Dirge of Cerberus, the Tsviets were designed with the idea of creating a sense of balance for the warriors with which players would already be familiar; primarily Vincent, Cloud and Sephiroth. Meanwhile, the prequel Crisis Core operated on the principle that this game dealt with those characters' "younger days", so that new elements could be added without changing the characters too much. One of the primary reasons Zack was chosen as the protagonist was because his fate was predetermined. The addition of the character of Genesis to the story came about after discussions between producer Hideki Imaizumi and the character's Japanese voice actor, Gackt, as Imaizumi had been impressed with the characters' brief appearance in the secret ending to Dirge of Cerberus: Final Fantasy VII, and felt there was great room to expand the character. Sephiroth's role was specifically written to give him a more human side.
Rather than using the character models and graphical style of Advent Children, which by that point had been developed using ten-year-old technology, the team decided to create new designs and models for characters: Nomura wished to balance the realism of Advent Children with cartoon stylization. Nomura was in charge of the revamped main character designs, while designer Roberto Ferrari was in charge of designs for secondary characters. Character modeling was supervised by Visual Works, Square Enix's CGI development branch. Cloud Strife's initial redesign for Final Fantasy VII Remake departed more dramatically from the original's, but was later altered to more closely resemble Nomura's original concept. Tifa Lockhart's original appearance was changed to make her look more realistic as members from the staff realized her design would not fit fight scenes. Sephiroth appears during the Midgar scenario despite not being properly introduced until a flashback Cloud experiences. Vice noted that Cloud sees the future of Aerith in the original 1997 game, leaving her fate unknown to returning fans. The main characters were adjusted in various ways for Remake. Rather than the "cool and collected" Cloud as seen in other games, Remake depicts his apathetic attitude as a façade to mask his insecurities. Nojima wanted to convey that his standoffishness could be seen as lame. Nojima worked hard to make the interactions between those three natural. In addition to returning characters, the team decided to expand the role of minor characters and write new characters.

Voice actors
Teruaki Sugawara, the voice director behind Kingdom Hearts, recommended Takahiro Sakurai, Cloud's Japanese voice actor, to Nomura for the role. Nomura had originally asked Sakurai to play the protagonist of video game The Bouncer, Sion Barzahd, but found that his voice best suited Cloud after hearing him speak. Sakurai received the script without any accompanying visuals, and first arrived for recording under the impression that he would be voicing a different character other than Cloud. For Advent Children, Nomura wanted to contrast Cloud and Vincent's voices given their similar personalities. As a sequel to the highly popular Final Fantasy VII, Sakurai felt greater pressure performing the role than he did when he voiced Cloud for Kingdom Hearts. The Japanese voice actors remained the same with Sakurai being surprised by this younger take on Cloud, having not voiced in the original PlayStation video game. Sakurai performed alongside Ayumi Ito, who voiced Tifa, for a few scenes. These recordings left him feeling "deflated", as the "exchanges he has with Tifa can be pretty painful", Sakurai commenting that Cloud—whom he empathized with as his voice actor—has a hard time dealing with straight talk. Nomura wanted Cloud and Vincent's voices to contrast with each other due to their similarities in terms of personality. He felt Vincent was older and more mature than Cloud, and as a result, he cast Shōgo Suzuki, who has a very low voice with.

In English adaptations, Cloud is voiced by Steve Burton. Burton was first hired to voice Cloud once a man behind Square saw his work in the 2001 film The Last Castle. Rachael Leigh Cook has stated in an interview for Kingdom Hearts II that she enjoys playing Tifa and described her as "very strong physical and emotionally, but also very sensitive" and as "very multi-dimensional". In voicing the character, Cook listened to Ito's recording as a guide to how the character sounds. Following Advent Children, Cook thanked Nomura for the film he created as she enjoyed it. Mena Suvari explained that Aerith was given a mothering feel with an ephemeral presence. 

For the English dub, Cody Christian (Cloud) commented on him being Burton's replacement, stating, "Steve, you paved the way. You made this character what it is and have contributed in shaping a legacy" and thus wanted to not let Burton down with his take on the character. John Eric Bentley did the voice of Barret, who did research in order to properly voice him. He was aided by the translators for the Japanese version, who gave him the context of the scenes he had to record. For him, one of the biggest challenges in his work was "representation" and claimed that Barret was more than one-dimensional character.

Playable characters

Cloud Strife

 is the protagonist of Final Fantasy VII, Final Fantasy VII:Advent Children, Final Fantasy VII Remake, and a recurring character through the Compilation. In Final Fantasy VII, he is a mercenary employed by the eco-terrorist organization AVALANCHE. He claims to be a former member of SOLDIER, until a key plot event helps him discover lost memories of his true self. Cloud is voiced in English by Steve Burton in most media, and Cody Christian in Final Fantasy VII Remake. His Japanese voice actor is Takahiro Sakurai.

Barret Wallace

 is the former leader of the eco-terrorist group AVALANCHE, opposed to Shinra's use of Mako technology, which he believes to be killing Gaia. He is also the adoptive father of Marlene, the daughter of his dead friend, Dyne. Initially, he distrusts and dislikes Cloud, believing him to be nothing more than a heartless mercenary-for-hire, but eventually changes his opinion of him for the better. After AVALANCHE disbands, Barret chooses to continue his mission to save the Planet by trying to find a new energy source to replace Mako. He is voiced in English by Beau Billingslea in Advent Children and Dirge of Cerberus, and John Eric Bentley in Final Fantasy VII Remake. His Japanese voice actor is Masahiro Kobayashi.

Tifa Lockhart

 is a childhood friend of Cloud. She is one of the lead members of AVALANCHE and it is she who initially convinces Cloud to join them in their rebellion against Shinra. She ultimately helps to unlock Cloud's missing memories when they fall into the Lifestream together, and she is the only character who knows of Cloud's past. Tifa appears in all the Compilation of Final Fantasy VII titles alongside Cloud. She is voiced in English by Rachael Leigh Cook in most media, and Britt Baron in Final Fantasy VII Remake. In Japanese she is voiced by Ayumi Ito in most appearances, Yōko Asada in Ehrgeiz (arcade), and Yūko Minaguchi in Ehrgeiz (PlayStation).

Aerith Gainsborough

 is a flower peddler on the streets of Midgar. She is sought after by Shinra's research department because she is the last of the Cetra (also known as the Ancients), and as such, Shinra believes she is the key to finding the fabled Promised Land. She meets Cloud during the first reactor mission and later on he became her bodyguard. Despite her dying at Sephiroth's hands during the events of VII, Aerith's spirit maintains her cognitive powers and she is able to retain her individuality while in the Lifestream. Aerith is voiced by Mandy Moore in Kingdom Hearts, Mena Suvari in Advent Children and Kingdom Hearts II, Andrea Bowen in Crisis Core, Dissida 012, Mobius Final Fantasy and Kingdom Hearts III Re Mind, and Briana White in Final Fantasy VII Remake. Her Japanese voice actress is Maaya Sakamoto.

Red XIII
, birth name , is a powerful, intelligent member of an unnamed feline species with the ability to speak. In Final Fantasy VII, he temporarily joins Cloud's team after they rescue him from Hojo at the Shinra building. Red XIII believed that his father, Seto, was a coward who abandoned their home, Cosmo Canyon, during a war with the Gi Tribe. Upon returning to Cosmo Canyon, however, his adoptive grandfather, Bugenhagen, brings Red XIII to the petrified body of Seto and reveals that he had sacrificed his life to save the village and single-handedly fought the entire invading army. Learning the truth, Red XIII becomes inspired and gains the courage to permanently join Cloud's group. Red XIII makes additional appearances throughout the Compilation. In Before Crisis, he defends a female of his species named Deneh and is subsequently captured by the Turks. In the On the Way to a Smile novella "Case of Nanaki", Red XIII struggles with the knowledge that he will outlive his friends. He also appears briefly in Advent Children and Dirge of Cerberus; in the former, he aids in the fight against the rogue summoned monster Bahamut SIN, and in the latter he is briefly glimpsed resting with Shelke during the ending. In Final Fantasy VII Lateral Biography Turks -The Kids Are Alright-, he saves a young girl from drowning, and briefly encounters Turk member Tseng.

Red XIII was the fourth character to be created by Nomura, who wanted a four-legged playable character in the cast despite inevitable graphical difficulties. He was originally conceived as a member of SOLDIER. His standard name, "Red XIII", was thought up by Nomura during the concept stage because he wanted something that didn't sound like a normal name. The final name came from combining the character's hair color with the number 13, an unlucky number. His real name, Nanaki, was chosen by other staff members. Nomura gave Red XIII tattoos and a general Native American motif. The character's tail having a flame at its tip was made to add more color. The name Nanaki was chosen due to its Native American sound, which linked with Red XIII's theme and backstory. Red XIII's limited appearance in Advent Children was due to difficulties with accurately animating the character's hair in a realistic manner. For his action scenes, four separate CGI layers had to be created and overlapped. In English he is voiced by Liam O'Brien in Advent Children and Max Mittelman in Final Fantasy VII Remake. In Japanese, he is voiced by Masachika Ichimura in Advent Children, and Kappei Yamaguchi in Remake.

Yuffie Kisaragi

 is the daughter of the leader of Wutai, who feels her country has lost its former glory in the aftermath of a war with Shinra and has become a resort town. Yuffie is introduced when she ambushes the protagonist Cloud Strife and his allies in either the Gongaga jungle or the forests south of Junon, appearing as "Mystery Ninja". If the player defeats her in combat and then chooses the correct series of dialogue choices, she introduces herself and joins the player's party as one of player characters. However, once in Wutai Village, Yuffie steals the party's Materia and hides but is kidnapped by a Midgar crime lord, the lecherous Don Corneo. When the group rescues Yuffie, she returns the stolen Materia and continues working with the party. Yuffie is voiced in English by Christy Carlson Romano in Kingdom Hearts and Advent Children, by Mae Whitman in Kingdom Hearts II, Dirge of Cerberus and Kingdom Hearts III Re Mind, and by Suzie Yeung in Final Fantasy VII Remake Intergrade. Her Japanese voice actress is Yumi Kakazu.

Cait Sith
 is a robotic talking cat. In Final Fantasy VII, he rides on the back of an unnamed robotic moogle; in later installments in the Compilation of Final Fantasy VII, he either walks by himself or rides Red XIII. As a robot, he can be rebuilt and replaced and is controlled by Reeve Tuesti, whose original intent during Final Fantasy VII was to infiltrate Cloud's group and sabotage their resistance efforts on behalf of his Shinra employers. Having a change of heart, he decides to help the group, even risking his life at one point by destroying a version of himself to extract the Black Materia needed by Sephiroth to summon the Meteor spell. He appears briefly in Advent Children and Final Fantasy VII Remake, and acts as a supporting character throughout Dirge of Cerberus. He is voiced by Greg Ellis in English and by Hideo Ishikawa in Japanese.

Vincent Valentine

 is an optional character in Final Fantasy VII. He is the protagonist of Dirge of Cerberus and its mobile spin-off. Cloud and the others discover him sleeping inside a coffin in the basement of the Shinra Mansion, where he joins them in their quest to hunt down Sephiroth. Vincent reveals very little about himself after his original introduction, and his backstory is explored in Dirge of Cerberus as well as other Compilation of Final Fantasy VII titles. He is voiced by Steven Blum in English and by Shōgo Suzuki in Japanese.

Cid Highwind

 is an airship pilot. He is first encountered trying to restart a rocket program cancelled by Shinra due to the actions of his assistant Shera when she was concerned for the safety of the rocket. He blames Shera for the incident as he does not believe her concerns were justified, and verbally abuses her. However, her concerns regarding the oxygen tanks are proven to be correct when an explosion temporarily traps Cid during a later successful attempt to launch the rocket against Meteor. As a result, Cid is able to forgive her. Cid also appears in Before Crisis, Advent Children and Dirge of Cerberus. In Advent Children, he briefly rejoins the party to fight against Bahamut SIN. In Dirge of Cerberus, he aids the World Regenesis Organization in launching an attack on Deepground headquarters, and later in fighting Omega WEAPON. He is voiced by Chris Edgerly in English and Kazuhiro Yamaji in Japanese.

Zack Fair

 is a minor character in Final Fantasy VII, although he is the protagonist of its prequel, Crisis Core. In the original game, Zack appears only in flashback sequences. He also appears in the Compilation of Final Fantasy VII titles Before Crisis, Last Order and Advent Children. He is the romantic hero to Aerith's heroine, and part of the mystery of Cloud's identity crisis. He is voiced in Japanese by Kenichi Suzumura and in English by Rick Gomez in most appearances, and by Caleb Pierce in Final Fantasy VII Remake.

The Turks
The  are a group of covert operatives who work for Shinra through many of the events of VII, and later become an independent force. Officially, while part of Shinra, they were known as the Investigation Sector of the General Affairs Department. In Final Fantasy VII, several Turks serve as recurring antagonists, although they are not above forming temporary alliances with the game's group of central characters. They are also the playable characters and protagonists of the Final Fantasy VII prequel, Before Crisis, which focuses exclusively on their actions in the years leading up to the events of the original game. The player chooses from eleven unnamed Turks, each with his or her own backstory, personality, strengths and weaknesses. With one exception, each Turk is identified based on their weapon and sex. Among important Turks in the series are:
In Advent Children, they act as allies towards Cloud and his friends, while glimpses of their earlier days with Shinra are portrayed in Before Crisis and Crisis Core. Reno is voiced by Quinton Flynn in most appearances and by Arnie Pantoja in Final Fantasy VII Remake in English and Keiji Fujiwara in Japanese. Rude is voiced by Crispin Freeman in most appearances and by William Christopher Stephens in Final Fantasy VII Remake in English and Taiten Kusunoki in Japanese.
 , the newest member of the Turks. Inexperienced and clumsy, but taking her job very seriously, she is an antagonist in VII and minor character in Advent Children. Elena is voiced by Bettina Bush in English and Megumi Toyoguchi in Japanese.
 , the leader of the Turks after Veld leaves the Turks in the aftermath of Sephiroth's attack on Nibelheim. Initially portrayed as an antagonist in VII, he acts as an ally in Crisis Core and is a minor character in Advent Children. Tseng is voiced by Ryun Yu in most appearances and by Vic Chao in Final Fantasy VII Remake in English and Junichi Suwabe in Japanese.
 , a playable character in Before Crisis and a supporting character in Crisis Core. Bearing the codename . While around Zack, she uses the name "Cissnei", though it is not her real name. Cissnei is voiced by Carrie Savage in English and Asumi Nakada in Japanese.
 , alternately called Verdot, is the former leader of the Turks. Originally a loyal member, he falls out of favor with the company during the struggle against AVALANCHE, which includes bungled operations and the company trying to use the Turks as cannon fodder. Veld eventually resigns his position upon finding out that his daughter, whom he thought dead in a bungled Shinra operation, is still alive under the name "Elfé". While he is declared an enemy of Shinra and apparently killed, he is in fact spirited away with his daughter so he can live his life in peace.
 , a Turk who acts as one of the main characters of Before Crisis. Generally known under the moniker of "Legendary Turk", and formally an anti-Shinra activist known as "Death God of the Battlefield", he is recruited into the Turks by Veld. While he leaves the Turks for a time, he returns after Veld resigns.

Antagonists

Sephiroth

 is the main antagonist of Final Fantasy VII and Advent Children. Originally a member of Shinra's SOLDIER elite, a traumatic incident involving his true origins drove him insane. This prompts him to abandon his humanity and attempt to attain godhood by absorbing the Lifestream, the source of life on the planet. He manipulates and tortures Cloud over the course of Final Fantasy VII, and kills Aerith at the Forgotten City. Cloud ultimately destroys him at the end of the game, but he returns in Advent Children, where he is reborn and subsequently defeated again by Cloud. Sephiroth also appears in nearly every title in the Compilation of Final Fantasy VII. The character is voiced in English by Lance Bass in the first Kingdom Hearts, George Newbern in most media, and Tyler Hoechlin in Final Fantasy VII Remake. In Japanese he is voiced by Toshiyuki Morikawa in most appearances, and Shin-ichiro Miki in Ehrgeiz.

Jenova
 is an extraterrestrial lifeform who crash-landed on the planet two thousand years prior to the events of VII, portrayed in multiple titles in the Compilation as a female humanoid. When Jenova originally crashed, she began infecting the Cetra with a virus, to the point that they were almost wiped out. However, a small group managed to seal Jenova in a tomb, which was later excavated by Shinra. Jenova was mistaken for a Cetra, and samples from her remains were used in the experiments that created SOLDIER and Sephiroth. Sephiroth and Jenova's goal in both Final Fantasy VII and Advent Children is to take control of the planet and use it to roam through space until they find another world to build on. In Advent Children, Jenova's last remains are acquired by Rufus, whilst the Remnants hope to find and use them to resurrect Sephiroth. Jenova is also responsible for the disease Geostigma, which infects all those who came into contact with the tainted Lifestream after Sephiroth was defeated.

Jenova's original forms during VIIs development were very different from her final incarnation; the original Jenova was a hostile region of the brain that would awake in people possessing certain genes. The name "Jenova" was to have been inherited by a book written by the Cetra on the subject. While Jenova's remains in Advent Children are called a "head", this is not technically accurate. The term was only used because developers couldn't think of a more suitable name. One of the ideas discussed for Sephiroth's resurrection was for the remnant to eat Jenova's remains. The disease caused by Jenova's presence in the Lifestream, Geostigma, was based on a discarded concept for Final Fantasy X.

Rufus Shinra
 is the former Vice President of Shinra, who is promoted to President after his father is killed by Sephiroth. Depicted as callous, cunning and ruthless during much of Final Fantasy VII, his attitudes towards how the Shinra Company should be run causes his father to attempt to bar him from ever controlling the company. As shown in Before Crisis, Rufus was anonymously supplying information to AVALANCHE, intending to have them kill his father. This failed and he is placed under house arrest. However, almost immediately upon his father's death, he claims control over the company and quickly begins running it by way of his preferred method. He later leads Shinra's efforts to find the Promised Land, as well as Shinra's military in battling the WEAPONs. Rufus was thought to have died when his office in Shinra Headquarters was hit by an energy blast from Diamond WEAPON, but in Advent Children, it is revealed that he survived, albeit after sustaining great injuries. The On the Way to a Smile novella "Case of Shinra" depicts his survival, as well as his plans for the future, and how he contracts Geostigma.

He appears in Advent Children in possession of Jenova's remains, and claims that he intends to repair the damage Shinra had caused to Gaia. In Advent Children, Rufus uses a wheelchair and covers himself with a white sheet, and although these are later shown to be a façade while he was holding Jenova's remains. While not seen in Dirge of Cerberus except in a flashback, it is hinted that he is secretly funding the WRO (World Regenesis Organization). Rufus is voiced by Wally Wingert in Advent Children and Josh Bowman in Final Fantasy VII Remake in English, and by Tōru Ōkawa in Japanese.

Professor Hojo
 is the biological father of Sephiroth and was the head of Shinra's "Department of Science and Research" until he resigned after being attacked by Red XIII at Shinra headquarters. While studying Jenova, he infused his unborn child with its cells; the result of this was Sephiroth, who would eventually grow up to have an element of control over Jenova. He was also responsible for making Vincent immortal. In Final Fantasy VII, Hojo is defeated by Cloud and his allies while trying to aid Sephiroth's plans, but in Dirge of Cerberus, it is revealed he survived long enough to store a digital copy of himself in the worldwide network; he subsequently takes control of Weiss' body and attempts through him to summon Omega WEAPON, which will drain the Lifestream from the Planet and launch into space in search of a new world. He is stopped by Vincent with the help of Nero, who merges with Weiss and frees him from Hojo's control, destroying Hojo in the process. Hojo also briefly appears in Before Crisis, Last Order, and Crisis Core. In English he is voiced by Paul Eiding in Dirge of Cerberus and Crisis Core and James Sie in Final Fantasy VII Remake. In Japanese he is voiced by Nachi Nozawa in Dirge of Cerberus, Last Order and Crisis Core, and Shigeru Chiba in Remake.

Kadaj, Loz, and Yazoo
Known as "Remnants", they are manifestations of Sephiroth's will, driven to find samples of their "mother" Jenova to trigger Sephiroth's resurrection and get vengeance upon the world. The three frequently come into conflict with the remains of Shinra and Cloud. Eventually, Kadaj is successful in merging with Jenova's cells, triggering Sephiroth's resurrection. Kadaj, like Sephiroth, is mortally wounded by Cloud and dies in his arms, while Loz and Yazoo die in a final attack on Cloud.

The remnants were created to represent different aspects of Sephiroth's personality: Kadaj represented his cruelty, Loz represented his strength, and Yazoo represented his allure. To fit in with the film's theme of the "next generation", they were all made younger than Cloud and Sephiroth. Kadaj's original moniker during production was "Lost Name". Kadaj, Loz and Yazoo are respectively voiced by Shotaro Morikubo, Kenji Nomura and Yuji Kishi in Japanese and Steven Staley, Fred Tatasciore and Dave Wittenberg in English.

Deepground
 is a military force created by Shinra which acts as the antagonist of Dirge of Cerberus, created by the company using genetic engineering to be a covert force. The leaders of Deepground are the Tsviets, an elite who were infused with genetic material belonging to Genesis Rhapsodos. The Tsviets' original leaders, the Restrictors, were overthrown when the Tsviets used one of their own who had yet to be fully indoctrinated to kill the Restrictor leader. During the events of Dirge of Cerberus, they are manipulated by Hojo possessing their leader into attempting to awaken OMEGA, a means for the Lifestream to escape the planet during times of catastrophe. Although one of the members, Shelke, is rescued from the group, the others are killed, although Weiss' body is rescued by Genesis and transported somewhere. The Tsviets are:
 , leader of the Tsviets and Nero's elder brother. While controlled by Hojo for most of the game, he ultimately acts as the game's true antagonist. Weiss is voiced by Jōji Nakata in Japanese and Dave Boat in English. In Final Fantasy VII Remake Intergrade, he is voiced by Daman Mills.
 , a member of the Tsviets and Weiss' younger brother. He holds the power to control darkness, and prior to the events of Dirge of Cerberus, he was kept in close confinement as his power was highly dangerous. Nero is voiced by Mike Rock in English and Ryōtarō Okiayu in Japanese. In Final Fantasy VII Remake Intergrade, he is voiced by Sean Chiplock.
 , a physically imposing member who acts as Shalua's handler. He first appeared in Before Crisis as a SOLDIER candidate who attracted Shinra's attention and was indoctrinated into Deepground. Azul is voiced by Brad Abrell in English and Tesshō Genda in Japanese.
 , a sadistic member of the group who was mentally damaged by the Deepground training program. She is the one who succeeds in extracting the Protomateria needed to activate OMEGA weapon from Vincent's body. Rosso is voiced by Mary Elizabeth McGlynn in English and Atsuko Tanaka in Japanese.
  is the youngest member of the group and the younger sister of Shalua Rui. Kidnapped when she was nine years old, Shelke was experimented on: the experiments give her the ability to send her consciousness into the Planet's worldwide network, but mentally scars her and traps her in a child's body that needs constant Mako injections to stay alive. Shelke is voiced by Kari Wahlgren in English and Fumiko Orikasa in Japanese.

Genesis Rhapsodos
 is a character first seen in Dirge of Cerberus who acts as the antagonist of Crisis Core. Genesis was a product of the same program that created Sephiroth, but Genesis was not as stable as Sephiroth and began suffering from a degenerative process called "degradation" after being wounded during a sparring match with Sephiroth and Angeal. Allying with a rogue Shinra scientist named Hollander, Genesis fights against the company while seeking a way to stop his degradation using Sephiroth's stable cells. Eventually, Genesis is first defeated by Zack, then cured of his degradation by the Lifestream. Genesis was taken in by Deepground, who gave him the codename "G", and used him to create the Tsviets. Refusing to follow along with the Tsviets' plans after their rebellion, he seals himself in a cave until he is needed. During the secret ending of Dirge of Cerberus, Genesis awakes, determined to protect and defend the planet.

Genesis was modeled on the character's Japanese voice actor, singer Gackt, who also composed and performed the theme songs (see "Redemption") for Dirge of Cerberus. While originally intended as a minor character cameo, Hideki Imaizumi, the producer of Crisis Core, found such a passing use of a character to be a waste and asked Gackt whether he was interested in further involvement. Gackt was eager to continue with the character, and ended up being one of the key creative minds behind Genesis' manners and personality. Genesis' outfit became one of Gackt's commonly worn outfits during concerts. Genesis is voiced in English by Robin Atkin Downes in Dirge of Cerberus and Oliver Quinn in Crisis Core.

Other characters

AVALANCHE
 is an important eco-terrorist organization in the world of Final Fantasy VII. It is introduced as the main rebel force against Shinra, openly opposed to the company's Mako-based energy production, which is draining the planet of life. Two versions of the organization existed: the first acted as the antagonists of Before Crisis, while the second featured many of the protagonists of VII. While the first version of the movement was indirectly destroyed by the actions of their leader, Shinra eventually crushed the movement completely, going to the lengths of destroying the sector seven of Midgar. Among its notable members were:
 , the scientific brains of AVALANCHE and the antagonist of Before Crisis. Holding a warped view of how humans are harming the Planet, he comes to believe that humanity needs to be destroyed for the planet to heal properly. To do this, he seeks the power of Zirconiade, a powerful summoned monster. While successful in summoning Zirconiade, the summon and Fuhito are defeated by the Turks, then Fuhito is killed by Shears.
  is the leader of AVALANCHE, later revealed to be Veld's lost daughter . Originally thought dead in a bungled operation during which her mother died and her town was destroyed, she was in fact taken to a Shinra facility and experimented on by Hojo, who implanted the Zirconiade materia into her body. While saved from death, she is apparently shot with her father by the Turks on orders from Shinra. The shooting was in fact a bluff to give Elfé and Veld a chance to live in peace.
 , AVALANCHE's second-in-command. Intensely loyal to Elfé and distrustful of Fuhito, he is quick to see that Fuhito only wants to use Elfé after finding out about the Materia she has in her. Allying with the Turks to save Elfé, he eventually sacrifices himself to destroy Fuhito.
They are killed while trying to defend sector seven's pillar. Biggs and Wedge are respectively voiced by Gideon Emery and Matt L. Jones in Final Fantasy VII Remake in English and by Shūhei Sakaguchi and Takayuki Asai respectively in Japanese.
  is a member of AVALANCHE and colleague/friend of Biggs and Wedge, also involved in the destruction of the Mako Reactor and is killed along with them during the same incident. In Final Fantasy VII Remake, Jessie has the surname "Rasberry". It is revealed that Jessie's motive for being a part of AVALANCHE is that her father was injured in an accident at Shinra and left in a coma. She also has various flirtateous interactions with Cloud. In Final Fantasy VII Remake, she is voiced by Erica Lindbeck in English and Satomi Moriya in Japanese.

Reeve Tuesti
 is the former head of Shinra's "Department of Urban Development", and is controller of the robotic cat Cait Sith. In Final Fantasy VII, Reeve originally worked against AVALANCHE, until later deciding to help them in their quest against Sephiroth: feeling repentant about his role, he aids the group through Cait Sith. He is temporarily arrested after Rufus' apparent death, but is released in time to organize an evacuation of Midgar's population before the arrival of Meteor. He also brings the news of Aerith's death to Elmyra Gainsborough, the adoptive mother of Aerith. Reeve plays a minor role in Before Crisis, as the architect responsible for designing Mako reactors and aiding the Turks with the use of Cait Sith. He is not seen in Advent Children, but is heard leaving a message on Cloud's cell phone. He plays a significant role in Dirge of Cerberus, where he has established the World Regenesis Organization, which is dedicated to restoring the Planet. He also appears in the On the Way to a Smile novella "Case of Denzel" and its OVA adaptation On the Way to a Smile - Episode: Denzel. He is voiced by Jamieson Price in every major appearance and by Jon Root in Final Fantasy VII Remake in English and by Banjō Ginga in Japanese.

Marlene
 is the young daughter of Barret's friends, Dyne and Eleanor, and the adopted daughter of Barret. Eleanor was killed by an attack from Shinra prior to the events of Final Fantasy VII, and Dyne assumes Marlene to be dead as well. In actuality, Barret adopts her, thinking Dyne is dead. Barret later encounters Dyne, who has gone insane. After fighting Barret, Dyne entrusts Marlene to Barret's care and commits suicide. For most of Final Fantasy VII, Marlene is left in the care of Elmyra, Aerith's adopted mother. During Advent Children, she lives with Cloud, Tifa, and Denzel, while Barret is searching for a new power source for the Planet. She is instrumental in making Cloud return to his friends and continue fighting against Sephiroth's Remnants. Marlene is voiced by Grace Rolek in English and Miyū Tsuzurahara in Japanese. In Advent Children Complete, she is voiced by Ariel Winter in English and by Sumire Morohoshi in Japanese. In Final Fantasy VII Remake she is voiced by Brielle Milla in English.

Shalua Rui
 is a minor character in Before Crisis and a supporting character in Dirge of Cerberus. When her sister Shelke was taken by Shinra for their Deepground unit, Shalua went in search of Shelke, joining AVALANCHE in the hope that they would lead her to her sister. During her time there, she received grave injuries resulting in the loss of her right eye and arm, and massive internal damage. This incident prompted her to leave AVALANCHE for good. In Dirge of Cerberus, she is part of the World Regenesis Organization, and is responsible for saving Vincent after he is overcome by the power of Chaos. She is eventually plunged into a coma while she is helping Vincent and Shelke escape and her life support mechanism, her artificial arm, is destroyed. Her ultimate fate is not specified. Shalua is voiced by Kim Mai Guest in English and Yuu Asakawa in Japanese.

Angeal Hewley
 is a SOLDIER 1st Class who is Zack Fair's friend and mentor, the original owner of the Buster Sword, and a close friend of Genesis and Sephiroth. Produced by the same project that birthed Genesis, when he finds out about his origins, he turns against Shinra and works with Genesis for a time. As he begins suffering from the same degradation as Genesis, he begins seeing himself as a monster and leaves Genesis, temporarily allying with Zack. Zack is eventually forced to fight and kill him. Angeal lives on for a while through Lazard Deusericus, the former director of SOLDIER who is made a copy of Angeal, and an animal-like copy. Both eventually die after protecting Cloud from a Shinra attack in Banora. Angeal is voiced by Josh Gilman in English and Kazuhiko Inoue in Japanese.

Lucrecia Crescent
 is a Shinra scientist first introduced in VII who acts as an important character in Dirge of Cerberus. A scientist working in Nibelheim under Hojo, she worked on the research into Chaos, which she injected into Vincent while he was a Turk assigned to protect her, and provided the maternal DNA for Sephiroth. Ridden with guilt over her actions, she seals herself inside a crystal, essentially becoming immortal and virtually cut off from the outside world. Her memories are uploaded into Shelke, and through them and recordings left behind for him, she is able to communicate with Vincent, eventually leaving a final message that she is glad he survived.

Lucrecia was originally a fairly minor character in VII. It was hard for the staff to recreate her for Dirge of Cerberus as they needed to rely on low-detail concept art and in-game models. To create the new model of Lucrecia, the concept team used Sephiroth's appearance as a base, deciding that the latter would have a maternal rather than paternal resemblance. Lucrecia is voiced by April Stewart in English and Rio Natsuki in Japanese.

Denzel
 is a young boy who resides with Cloud, Tifa, and Marlene in the city of Edge. He first appears in Advent Children as a sufferer of the incurable disease Geostigma. He and many other sick children are lured to the Ancient City of the Cetra, where they are brought under Kadaj's control. Denzel regains his senses after Tifa protects him from Bahamut SIN during the final conflict. He is later healed of his Geostigma by drinking the water in Aerith's church. In Advent Children, Denzel is voiced by Benjamin Bryan in English and Kyosuke Ikeda in Japanese, and Advent Children Complete, he is voiced by Aaron Refvem in English and Kazumu Izawa in Japanese.

Reception

Critical reception

The characters of VII received near-unanimous praise from critics for their original appearance. In an article on GameSpot, it was stated that, despite the premise not being unique, it was "Cloud's interactions with other characters, especially between him and [Sephiroth] which make the story so special". Thierry Nguyen of Computer Gaming World found that both the story and character development were strong, saying that as the players progressed through the game, "these characters intrigue you, and you get so attached to them that you might jump as a reaction to a shocking event on the first disc. Final Fantasy VII evokes that kind of emotional response". Steve Bauman of Computer Games Magazine called the characters "funky", saying that the characters "worked wonders" on some of the poorer dialogue. Simon Parkin of Eurogamer praised the characters' "clear motivations, desires and flaws". RPGFan generally praised the characters, especially Cloud, Tifa and Sephiroth, and said that "while on the surface they certainly do appear to fit certain stereotypes, a second look will reveal that they transcend these qualities and are compelling and complex personalities underneath".

While the mobile game Before Crisis, the first Compilation game title to be released, has received limited western commentary, writers at AnimeFringe felt that "the chance to reverse the good and bad guy roles should be welcomed by many". Advent Children received mixed views from critics. Carlo Santos of Anime News Network felt that, due to the film's pace and context, viewers were not given enough time to get to know the characters. These sentiments were echoed by John Eriani of Mania Entertainment, who particularly faulted the lack of character names or explanations of the villains' motives. Chris Carle of IGN was critical of the lack of motivation for those who were not familiar with the series, but praised both the English and Japanese voice acting. Michael Beckett of RPGamer, while generally less than impressed by the overall story, said that it "[provides] some interesting insights into a few of the less-developed characters of the game, though Cloud receives most of the attention and development as the story unfolds".

Opinions on the characters of Dirge of Cerberus were again mixed to positive. IGN's Jeremy Dunham was fairly positive, saying that the new characters "go through quite a bit of development and even some of the old ones have a chance to shine". He was also pleased with Vincent's portrayal and development in the title. Rob Fahey of Eurogamer felt that the focus on characters that were secondary or optional in the original was a weak point of the game, and that those not familiar with the original game would possibly feel lost. GameSpot's Greg Mueller praised the game's focus on Vincent's origins and development, despite finding the large number of new characters a little confusing. Crisis Cores characters were generally praised. GameSpot's Kevin VanOrd said that, despite new and familiar characters appearing, it was the further-explored characters of Zack and Sephiroth that he found himself sympathising with: "The way their personal stories weave in and out of each other—and set the stage for the events in Final Fantasy VII—makes Crisis Core not just the finest role-playing experience available on the PSP, but also one of the best Japanese RPGs in years". Ryan Clements, writing for IGN, was pleased by the story's focus on Zack and his interactions with other characters rather than a grand narrative. Gerard Villorria of GameSpy was also positive, saying that exploring the relationships between old characters was "a key element", while finding the new characters and their backstories "equally interesting".

In regards to remake, IGN called its "emotional arcs". Despite noting his antisocial attitudes in the remake, IGN and GameSpot commented that Cloud is the character who has the most notable arc in Remake, with Cody Christian's performance helping to improve his appeal. The idea that there are four characters with Sephiroth's name led VG247 to note the remake still had its own mysteries that original players would not understand while the title. Siliconera described this incarnation of the antagonist as haunting, due to how he often appears within Cloud's hallucinations across the plot. Still, the site noticed that despite being a remake, the game explored different situations of the narrative similar to the films known as Rebuild of Evangelion that also retold an anime but with multiple changes. The portrayal of the supporting characters also earned positive response such as the potential Barret was given to develop him in the sequel or Aerith's traits and some ambiguous scenes involving her.

In the book The World of Final Fantasy VII: Essays on the Game and Its Legacy, Cloud is also seen as a Messiah with Tifa and Aerith being one of his main supporters to help progress and defeat Sephiroth, though the end of the narrative has Cloud appreciating the victory thanks to his "pillars". While Cloud is never addressed as a God, he instead has to protect God's peace as Sephiroth instead plays the role of Satan as well as his own Shadow with Cloud having to surpass him in the narrative.

Legacy
The characters of Final Fantasy VII and the Compilation have remained highly popular, often being cited as some of the best characters in both the Final Fantasy series and video games in general by both critics and fans. Reader and critic lists on gaming site IGN have all placed them high, with one reader poll in 2014 having multiple VII characters dominating a list of the top ten characters in the series as a whole. Sephiroth remains one of the most popular villains in video game history, unanimously voted number one by the staff of Electronic Gaming Monthly in their "Top 10 Video Game Bosses" list in October 2005. In late 2007, Dengeki PlayStation named Cloud Strife the best character of all time in their retrospective awards feature about the original PlayStation. Aerith placed fifth, Tifa placed eighth and three other characters placed in the top 50; Sephiroth at fourteenth, Reno at fifteenth, and Yuffie at forty-second. Cloud placed second in a Famitsu reader poll for Japan's favorite video game character. In a list of the best Final Fantasy characters made by Complex, characters from Final Fantasy VII occupied seven out of the twenty places, with Sephiroth and Cloud coming third and first respectively. The character of Cloud has also influenced character design in the series, having had a profound influence on the design and portrayal of Lightning, the central protagonist of Final Fantasy XIII and its sequels.

References

 
Final Fantasy 07